A Gokoku Shrine is a shrine dedicated to the spirit (Eirei) of those who died for the nation, renamed from shōkonsha in 1939 (Showa 14). Before World War II, they were under the jurisdiction of the Ministry of the Interior, but after World War II they are administered by an independent religious corporation . Designated Gokoku Shrines were built in prefectures except Tokyo and Kanagawa Prefecture. The main deities are war dead from the prefecture or those who are related to them, as well as self-defense officers, police officers, firefighters, and others killed in the line of duty.

Outline 
Gokoku Shrines were established by the Promulgation of March 15, 1939 and the Coming into force of April 1 in Showa 14. The name "Shokonsha" was changed to Gokoku Shrine because there was a contradiction in the name, since "Shokonsha" refers to a temporary or temporary ritual and "Sha" refers to a permanent facility. The name "Gokoku" was coined from the phrase "I wish to establish a foundation for the protection of the nation" in the draft order rescript of December 28, 1872 (November 28, 1872) and in the January 4, 1882 Imperial Rescript to Soldiers and Sailors, "If you devote yourself to the protection of the nation," etc., was adopted because it was the most appropriate way to praise the deeds of the deities and because it was familiar to people who had already used terms such as "heroic spirit of national defense" and the like. The total number of Gokoku Shrines is estimated to be 131 as of April 1939 (Showa 14).

The status of the shrine was determined in accordance with Article 1, Paragraph 1 of the "Shinto Shrines under Prefectural Shrines" (No. 22 of the Edict of 1894), which was revised at the same time as the introduction of the Gokoku Shrine System. They are divided into designated Gokoku Shrines, which correspond to prefectural shrines designated by the Minister of Home Affairs, and undesignated Gokoku Shrines, which correspond to other village shrines. With the acceptance of the Potsdam Declaration in August 1945, Japan became the first country to receive the occupation, Gokoku Shrine was considered a militarist institution and had to be renamed, for example, by removing the word "Gokoku" from its name, in order to ensure its continued existence.。When the San Francisco Peace Treaty went into effect in 1952 and Japan regained its sovereignty, the majority of the renamed shrines returned to their former names. After World War II, some of the designated shrines of the Jinja Honcho became Beppo Shrines.

Although some of the deities of each shrine overlap with those of Yasukuni Shrine, the deities of each shrine are not separated from Yasukuni Shrine, and they perform their own rituals by inviting the souls of their own deities.。Therefore, officially, Gokoku Shrine is "not in a headquarter branch relationship with Yasukuni Shrine. However, Yasukuni Shrine and Gokoku Shrine, which both enshrine the spirits of the dead, are deeply involved and have various exchanges. Zenkoku Gokoku Jinja-kai (formerly Urayasu-kai), organized by 52 major Gokoku Shrines, works in cooperation with Yasukuni Shrine and conducts various activities to honor the spirits of the dead. The Okinawa Gokoku-jinja Shrine also enshrines the dead of the Battle of Okinawa, including ordinary residents, schoolchildren in distress, and civilian war dead. In addition, about 10,000 mobilized students and female volunteer corps members who were victims of the Atomic bomb are also enshrined as deities at Hiroshima Gokoku Shrine.

After the issuance of the Shinto Directive by GHQ after World War II, the state no longer had the authority to direct and supervise shrines, and the decree stipulating that the deities of Gokoku Shrine were the deities of Yasukuni Shrine expired.

Perhaps due to the lapse of the law and the suggestion of Hideo Kishimoto Tokyo Imperial University, then assistant professor of the Faculty of Letters, some Gokoku Shrines began to dedicate other deities than Yasukuni Shrine to be enshrined in the Gokoku Shrines. In total, there are 23 Gokoku Shrines enshrining local greats and Self Defense Force officers who died in the line of duty in Sapporo, Akita, Niigata, Fukushima, Tochigi, Yamanashi, Nagano, Toyama, Ishikawa, Fukui, Matsue, Ehime, Kagawa, Tokushima, Kochi, Yamaguchi, Saga, Oita, Nagasaki, Kumamoto, Miyazaki, Kagoshima and Okinawa.

According to "A Consideration of the Enshrinement of Martyred Self-Defense Forces at Gokoku Shrine" by Daishi Shimaya, "In most Gokoku Shrines, when deities other than Yasukuni Shrine are enshrined, they are enshrined in a separate deity body from the main shrine, and are clearly distinguished. This is a clear distinction.

In 1960, Emperor Showa and Empress Kōjun bestowed the sacred objects to 52 shrines of the Gokoku Shrines throughout Japan, and since then the gifts have continued every 10 years since 1945.

Since its establishment, Gokoku Shrine has been supported operationally and financially mainly by the Bereaved Families Association and the War Alumni Association of the war dead. However, as the number of bereaved families and war comrades who had direct knowledge of the war dead has aged, the number has been decreasing, and it is expected that more Gokoku Shrines will be hit by financial crisis. For this reason, the former designated Gokoku Shrines have established a reverence and veneration association. The Meguro Gokoku Shrine in Tokyo Meguro Ward, which existed in Gohonki, was managed by the Meguro Gokoku Shrine Venerable Society established in October 1959 (1959), but since the officers had passed away and no one took over management, the shrine was sold to a Meguro Ward external The building was demolished in May 2008 (Heisei20) after an audit pointed out that the building had been destroyed.

History 
The Chōshū Domain and Satsuma Domain in the Bakumatsu era established a place for the spirits of the martyrs and war dead of national affairs, and held a ceremony to honor them. The Royal court also held a Satsuma Domain ceremony to honor the spirits of the martyrs and war dead in 1868 June 29 (May 10, Keio 4), in accordance with the Dajokanbunsho, Article 385 refers to 1853 (Kaei 6). The Shiai U (Reizan Kansai Shokonsha, later Kyoto Ryozen Gokoku Shrine). On July 21 of the same year (June 2, Keiō4/the first year of Meiji), Chikahito Arisugawa, the Grand Governor of the Eastern Expedition, held a ceremony in the hall of Edo Castle to honor the war dead of the government forces. Similarly, Han systems and other local feudal lords held ceremonies for the war dead of their clansmen or at places where they were related to them. The following year, 1869 (the 2nd year of Meiji), "Tokyo Shokonsha" (later Yasukuni Shrine) was built on Kudanzaka in Tokyo to enshrine the war dead since the Boshin Senso.

With the Abolition of the han system of 1871 (Meiji 4), private temples built by former feudal lords or the people were placed under the jurisdiction of the new Meiji government, and in 1874 (Meiji 7), it was decided to exempt temples from land tax and to pay for ritual fees and repairs at government expense.。In 1875 (Meiji 8), it was decided to enshrine the spirits of the dead since 1853 (Kaei 6) at the Tokyo Shokonsha、The shrine names were unified to Shokensha while the various places of worship remained in place as before. On June 4, 1879 (12th year of Meiji), Tokyo Shokensha was renamed Yasukuni Shrine and listed as a Modern system of ranked Shinto shrines.

In 1901 (34th year of the Meiji era), it was stipulated that the "kansai" (government festival) be attached to the shakensha that were eligible for government funding, and shakensha that were not eligible for funding were distinguished by the term "privately funded shakensha". After the First Sino-Japanese War and Russo-Japanese War, the number of applications for the creation of privately funded shakensha (private rite shakensha) increased, and the Shrine Bureau of the Ministry of the Interior issued a new regulation in 1907 (Meiji 40), which read The "Shokonsha Establishment" (February 23, 1907, Secret Letter No. 16, by order of the Director-General of the Home Ministry's Bureau of Shinto Shrines) established the criteria for establishing a shokonsha and restricted its establishment to those who were enshrined at Yasukuni Shrine, thereby discouraging its establishment. However, in 1931 (Showa 6), the Mukden Incident occurred, and in 1937 (Showa 12), the Sino-Japanese War), there was a growing demand in many areas to enshrine the spirits of the war dead in their hometowns.

In 1939 (Showa 14), the "Notice Concerning the Establishment of Shokonsha" (February 3, Showa 14, 1939, No. 30, letter from the Director-General of the Bureau of Shrines) authorized the establishment of only one shrine in each prefecture, with a few exceptions.

Controversy 
After the establishment of the Japan Self-Defense Forces, the JSDF also began to enshrine at Gokoku Shrine those JSDF officers who had died in the line of duty. The first time, the number of people who were killed in the war was increased to 1,000. However, as before World War II, both enshrinement and application for enshrinement were made without seeking the consent of the bereaved families, so the wives of fallen SDF officers who are Christians could file claims for cancellation of enshrinement and Damages on the grounds that their religious Personality rights had been violated.

See also 

 State Shinto
 War memorial

Notes

References 

 内務省神社局編『神社法令輯覧』、帝國地方行政學會、1925年
 内務省神社局「護国神社制度の確立」『週報』第131號、内閣情報部、1939年4月19日號、2-8頁（週報 第131号 - 国立公文書館デジタルアーカイブ）

External links 

 全国護国神社一覧、靖國神社

Gokoku shrines
Pages with unreviewed translations